Joshua Twing Brooks (February 27, 1884 – February 7, 1956) was a Democratic member of the U.S. House of Representatives from Pennsylvania.

Biography
Brooks was born in Edgeworth (now Sewickley), Pennsylvania. He graduated from the Sheffield Scientific School of Yale University in 1908.

He was engaged in the steel industry after graduation.  During the First World War, Brooks served in the Quartermaster Division in Washington, D.C., purchasing steel products for the Army. After the war he returned to Sewickley, and continued in the steel industry. He later established his own business as a distributor of railway supplies and steel products.

Brooks was elected as a Democrat to the Seventy-third and Seventy-fourth Congresses. He was an unsuccessful candidate for renomination in 1936. After his time in Congress, he served as a member of the Pennsylvania Liquor Control Board at Harrisburg, Pennsylvania, from 1937 to 1939.

He served as assistant director of aviation for Allegheny County, Pennsylvania, from 1940 to 1948, and as manager of Allegheny County Airport from 1949 to 1956. He died in Sewickley, aged 71, and is buried in Sewickley Cemetery.

Sources

The Political Graveyard

1884 births
1956 deaths
People from Edgeworth, Pennsylvania
People from Sewickley, Pennsylvania
Politicians from Harrisburg, Pennsylvania
Yale School of Engineering & Applied Science alumni
Democratic Party members of the United States House of Representatives from Pennsylvania
20th-century American politicians